My Fault may refer to:

Music 
 "My Fault", a song by Eminem from The Slim Shady LP
 "My Fault", a song by Imagine Dragons from Continued Silence EP
 "My Fault", a song by Tech N9ne from Planet
 "My Fault (Ghetto Apology)", a song by Nivea

Television 
 "My Fault" (Scrubs), a third season episode of Scrubs